Kirov is a town and the administrative center of Kirovsky District in Kaluga Oblast, Russia, located on the Bolva River (Desna's tributary)  southwest of Kaluga, the administrative center of the oblast. Population:  29,000 (1970).

History
The settlement of Pesochnya was founded in 1745. It was granted town status and renamed Kirov in honor of Sergey Kirov in 1936.

Administrative and municipal status
Within the framework of administrative divisions, Kirov serves as the administrative center of Kirovsky District, to which it is directly subordinated. As a municipal division, the town of Kirov is incorporated within Kirovsky Municipal District as Kirov Urban Settlement.

Military
The town is home to the Shaykovka (air base).

References

Notes

Sources

Cities and towns in Kaluga Oblast
Populated places established in 1745
1745 establishments in the Russian Empire
Zhizdrinsky Uyezd